Perilous Holiday is a 1946 American film noir crime film directed by Edward H. Griffith and starring Pat O'Brien and Ruth Warrick. The screenplay concerns a woman newspaper reporter who is on the trail of a smuggling ring operating out of Mexico.

Plot
Patrick Nevil makes the casual acquaintance of fellow American Agnes Stuart while on vacation in Mexico City. What Stuart doesn't know is that Nevil is a treasury agent, out to get expatriate counterfeiters Dr. Lilley and George Richards. What Nevil doesn't know is that Stuart is also out to get Lilley, whom she holds responsible for her father's death.

Cast

References

Bibliography
 Stephens, Michael L. Art Directors in Cinema: A Worldwide Biographical Dictionary. McFarland, 1998.

External links
 

1946 films
1940s crime thriller films
1940s English-language films
American crime thriller films
Films directed by Edward H. Griffith
Columbia Pictures films
Films set in Mexico
American black-and-white films
Films scored by Paul Sawtell
1940s American films